Cintura (Italian, Spanish, Portuguese "waist") may refer to:

Cintura, jeweled belt 
Cintura, lower back pain
Cintura, belted tyre made by Pirelli

Places
Cintura Formation, a geologic formation in Arizona.
Linha de Cintura, a railway line in Lisbon, Portugal
Milan belt railway (in Italian, Linea di cintura di Milano), a semicircular railway linking the railway lines converging on Milan, Italy, with each other and the Milano Centrale station

Arts and entertainment
Cintura (album), 2007 album by Portuguese pop-rock band Clã
La cintura, erotic tale by Alberto Moravia
La cintura (film), English title The Belt, 1989 Italian erotic film based on the Moravia tale
"La Cintura" (song), 2018 single by Álvaro Soler from his album Mar de Colores